Boltaq (also Romanized as Bolţāq and Balţāq; also known as Baltagh) is a village in Karchambu-e Jonubi Rural District, in the Central District of Buin va Miandasht County, Isfahan Province, Iran. At the 2006 census, its population was 1,323, in 296 families.

References 

Populated places in Buin va Miandasht County